Hull is an unincorporated community in Emmons County, in the U.S. state of North Dakota.

History
A post office called Hull was established in 1888, and remained in operation until 1954. The community took its name from Hull, Iowa, and it is a Dutch community.

References

Unincorporated communities in Emmons County, North Dakota
Unincorporated communities in North Dakota